Trichomycterus longibarbatus is a species of pencil catfish endemic to Brazil, where it is only known from a very small area in Espírito Santo near Santa Teresa.

References

External links

longibarbatus
Fish of South America
Fish of Brazil
Endemic fauna of Brazil
Fish described in 1992